Victoria Pattison may refer to:

Vicky Pattison, English TV personality
Victoria Pattison (gymnast) in 2004 World Sports Acrobatics Championships